List of Guggenheim Fellowships awarded in 1967

See also
 Guggenheim Fellowship

References

1967
1967 awards